Cedar Springs is a rural unincorporated community in northeast Allen County, Kentucky, United States. The community is located near the intersection of U.S. Route 31E and Kentucky Route 252.

References

Unincorporated communities in Allen County, Kentucky
Unincorporated communities in Kentucky